Kabita is a 1977 Indian Bengali-language film directed by Bharat Shumsher, starring Mala Sinha in the lead role. The film is a remake of the Tamil classic film Aval Oru Thodar Kathai (1974) where Kamal Haasan had a supporting role as a neighbor. He played the same role in the Bengali remake, thus his only foray into Bengali film industry. He also acted in the Telugu remake Anthuleni Katha (1976) with Jaya Prada, playing a different role as her boss and suitor. He also did a guest role in another remake, the Kannada film Benkiyalli Aralida Hoovu (1983) with his real-life niece Suhasini playing the lead role. The only remake he didn't appear in is the Hindi film Jeevan Dhaara (1982) starring Rekha.

Cast
 Mala Sinha as Kabita Ray
 Kamal Haasan as Gopal Menon
 Ranjit Mallick
 Anil Chatterjee
 Samit Bhanja
 Mahua Roychoudhury
 Sandhya Roy
 Bikash Ray
 Sulata Chowdhury
 Satindra Bhattacharya
 Bankim Ghosh
 Kamu Mukhopadhyay
 Shamita Biswas
 Bimal Deb
 Prema Narayan
 Kabita Panday

Songs

References

External links

1977 films
Bengali-language Indian films
Bengali remakes of Tamil films
Films about women in India
1970s Bengali-language films